John F. Kennedy High School is a public high school located in Fremont, California, in the United States. It opened in the fall of 1965 with nine buildings.

Academics
On March 24, 2007, a team of Kennedy students won the World Affairs Challenge held at San Francisco State University, sponsored by World Savvy.

John F. Kennedy High School is also host to Mission Valley Regional Occupational Program, or MVROP, where students and adults attend courses in career fields including culinary arts, firefighting, automotive repair, and video production.

Athletics
Kennedy High belongs to the Mission Valley Athletic League, which comprises the high schools from Fremont, Newark Memorial of Newark, James Logan of Union City, and Moreau Catholic of Hayward. Kennedy High School is also part of the North Coast Section (NCS). Their mascot is the Titan, and their colors are purple and gold.

Their Varsity Football Team has won 4 MVAL League championships; 1972, 1988 (in a three-way shared title with Washington High and James Logan High), 2014 and 2016.

Notable alumni
Emilio Castillo, founding member of Tower of Power
Dominic Kinnear, former soccer player and former head coach of the San Jose Earthquakes and Houston Dynamo of US Major League Soccer
Lamond Murray, the only Mission Valley Athletic League basketball player to reach the NBA
Roman René Ramírez, singer and guitarist of Sublime with Rome
Randy Ready, former Major League Baseball player
Cal Stevenson, Major League Baseball player

See also
 List of memorials to John F. Kennedy

References

External links
John F. Kennedy High School website

Schools in Fremont, California
Fremont Unified School District
Educational institutions established in 1965
High schools in Alameda County, California
Public high schools in California
1965 establishments in California
Monuments and memorials to John F. Kennedy in the United States